The Persha Liha or Ukrainian First League is a professional football league in Ukraine and the second tier of national football competitions pyramid. Members of the league also participate in the Ukrainian Cup. It is the highest division of Professional Football League.

History 
The league was set up by the newly reorganized Football Federation of Ukraine (a successor of the Football Federation of the Ukrainian SSR) with the falling apart Soviet Union as a second tier, lower than Ukrainian Higher League (Vyshcha Liha) and higher that Ukrainian Transitional League (Perekhidna Liha).

The very first round of games that took place for this league was on 14 March 1992. The league itself was organised just a few months before that and consisted mostly of all the Ukrainian clubs that previously competed in the one of groups of the Soviet Lower Second League (4th tier, see Ukrainian Soviet competitions). To the league were also added some Soviet Top League reserve squads of the Soviet Top League reserve squads competition and the three best performers of the Ukrainian football championship among amateurs, KFK (Fitness clubs).

The Persha Liha (First League) is lower than the Vyshcha Liha (Higher League) (currently known as the Ukrainian Premier League) and is the second division of the Ukrainian professional football league system.

The First League was incorporated into the PFL organisation that combined all the football leagues of non-amateur clubs (Top, First, and Second). On 26 May 1996 the Constituent Conference of non-amateur clubs took place which created the professional league, and confirmed its statute as well as its administration. Most of the clubs that had previously participated in the Ukrainian football league competitions were reorganized as professional, a process that actually started in the late 1980s. On 17 July the professional league signed an agreement with several other national football organizations to organize competitions among the professional clubs (its members). According to the newspaper Halychyna (Ivano-Frankivsk) the annual budget of league's clubs varied between ₴6 million to ₴30 million in 2010.

The League officially became the top league of the Professional Football League (PFL) from 15 April 2008 when the Ukrainian Premier League reorganized itself into a self-governed entity. Usually the top two teams from the First League are promoted to the Premier League, while the two lowest teams from the Premier League are demoted to the First League. Because each club is only allowed to be represented with a single squad per each league, the second squad's promotion often is voided, thus, allowing the promotion of the third placed club during a season. One of the most successful second squads is of Dynamo Kyiv (FC Dynamo-2 Kyiv).

Current composition 
The following teams are competing in the 2021–22 season. Note, in parenthesis shown the actual home cities and stadiums.

Location map 
The following displays the location of teams.

Format of competition

General description
The league conducts its competition in a regular double round-robin format where each team plays with every other one twice. The league conducts its competitions from fall to spring, however due to climate conditions in Ukraine, a mid-season winter break is usually longer than the summer break between competition seasons. Since 1995 the league also follows the same system of points calculation that is adopted throughout the whole European continent, 3 points for win, one for draw, and none for loss.

Number of participants
During its history the number of members in the league has fluctuated. In its first years before 1999 the league consisted of 20 or more participants. Later there was an idea to decrease the number of members in all leagues in order to improve the quality of competition. Until 2013 the number of participants was reduced to 18 except for couple of seasons in 2006–2008. Recently since 2013 the number was reduced further to 16 where it remains since.

Relegation and promotion
Traditionally two better teams out of First League are being swapped for two worse teams out of Premier (Higher) League. On more rare occasions a third team gets a chance of promotion, but there were also seasons when only one team would get promoted. Only twice three teams were promoted to the top division, both times happening due to the top tier expansion. The league's winner and usually the second placed runner-up get accepted to the Premier League. However, due to the rule that a second team of the club cannot be promoted when its senior team plays in a higher tier, on few occasions when a second club team finished in top two places the third-placed team was admitted to the top division. In 2013 there was set a precedent when a club on its own will has refused to be promoted. In 2017 there was created another precedent when a club that earned promotion was denied it based on administrative decision.

With relegation, the league's policy is a bit different, although originally it also was two for two. In 1996 the Second League (lower tier) was converted into a de facto regional league with two (three) regional groups. The league has also decreased its number of participants from originally 22-24 to only 16-18. There were also number of withdrawals which triggered sometime additional number in rotation.

The relegation or promotion play-offs were previously usually organized under unforeseen circumstances such as a team's withdrawal from the league and often were not scheduled until after the season had concluded. Since 2011 relegation play-offs have become a well established tradition.

Since the turn of the millennium the frequency of withdrawals in the First League has increased among the competing clubs. In order to fight this, the league has been applying a stricter approach to every club's financial situation to avoid withdrawals during a season.

League's popularity
Since the 2009–10 season the First League has started to broadcast selected matches over the internet in order to increase its popularity.

The most successful clubs in the league are FC Dynamo-2 Kyiv, FC Hoverla Uzhhorod, and FC Zirka Kropyvnytskyi. All of those teams were either disbanded or went through some sort of reorganizations. In 2016 Dynamo Kyiv withdrew its second team from professional competitions, while FC Hoverla was refused in attestation. Previously in 2008 FC Zirka that went through reorganization was re-established based on a local youth football club FC Olimpik Kropyvnytskyi and in 2016 won its third championship in the league.

Past winners and runners
Promoted teams are indicated in bold.

Post-season play-offs
Post-season play-offs are not common feature of the First League competition. Over the years there were several instances when clubs contested promotion or relegation berths. The first post-season feature consisted of a relegation mini tournament that took place in July 1998 in Kyiv and Boryspil. It involved three group winners of the Second League and Bukovyna that placed 18th place in the First League. The tournament identified clubs which would qualify for the 1998–99 Ukrainian First League. The next year the league featured its first promotion play-off.

Promotion play-offs

Relegation play-offs

Statistics

Performance by club

Notes:

  ‡ – indicates a phoenix club of the original

League winners by region

All-time table
Top-20. All figures are correct through the 2019–20 season. Club status is current of the 2020–21 season:

People

Players
Among notable players of the league are its top scorers. The title of the league's top scorer earned on multiple occasions the following players, Serhiy Chuichenko (4 times, Polihraftekhnika Oleksandriya), Oleh Hrytsai (2 times, FC Cherkasy), Oleksandr Aliyev (2 times, Dynamo-2 Kyiv), Matviy Bobal (2 times, Ihroservis Simferopol), Oleksandr Akymenko (2 times, Stal / Inhulets).

Managers

No manager has won the league more than two times. With 2 league titles there are Valeriy Zuyev (both Dynamo-2 Kyiv), Oleksandr Ishchenko (Zirka and Illichivets), Yuriy Koval (Zirka and Zorya), Oleksandr Sevidov (Hoverla and Illichivets), Volodymyr Sharan (both Oleksandriya).

Stadiums

Considered to be as second tier competitions, the league has number of big stadiums with capacity of 20,000+, among which the most notable are Metalist Stadium in Kharkiv, Dnipro-Arena in Dnipro, Ukraina Stadium in Lviv, Yuvileiny Stadium in Sumy and Shakhtar Stadium in Donetsk. Just before the Euro 2012, the First League clubs also played at the RSC Olimpiyskiy also located in Donetsk. Among smaller stadiums (10,000 – 20,000) are Central Stadium in Mykolaiv, Dynamo Stadium in Kyiv, Avanhard Stadium in Lutsk, Chernihiv Stadium in Chernihiv and Central Stadium in Cherkasy.

Attendance
Most attended games in the league (1992-2017) recorded at Yuvileiny Stadium (Sumy).

The most attended seasons were in the beginning of the 1990s and the beginning of the 2000s.

References

External links
 Official website of the Professional Football League of Ukraine

 
2
Sports leagues established in 1992
1992 establishments in Ukraine
Ukr
Professional Football League of Ukraine
Professional sports leagues in Ukraine